Basketbal Pezinok was a Slovak professional basketball club, based in Pezinok, Slovakia. The club used to compete in the Slovak Extraliga. Pezinok is the most successful team in Slovak basketball history, having won a record 9 national championships. From the period 1996 til 2001, Pezinok was the Slovak champion for six seasons in a row.

In December 2010, the team was dissolved.

Sponsorship names
1991–1992Lokomotiva Pezinok
1996–2005Slovakofarma Pezinok
2005–2007MBK Pezinok
2007–2008BK Skanska Pezinok
2008–2009AB Cosmetics Pezinok
2009–2010Basketbal Pezinok

Honours
Slovak Extraliga Championships: 9
1993, 1996–97, 1997–98, 1998–99, 1999–2000, 2000–01, 2001–02, 2007–08, 2009–10
Slovak Cups: 7
1997, 1999, 2000, 2002, 2008, 2009, 2010

References

Basketball teams in Slovakia
Pezinok District
1991 establishments in Czechoslovakia
Sport in Bratislava Region
Basketball teams established in 1991